Kalian Rivalino Sams (born August 25, 1986) is a Dutch professional baseball player for L&D Amsterdam of the Honkbal Hoofdklasse. He played for Team Netherlands in the 2019 European Baseball Championship, and at the Africa/Europe 2020 Olympic Qualification tournament in Italy in September 2019. In 2019, he won the national championship with the Amsterdam team.

Career

Seattle Mariners
After playing 2 seasons in the Dutch Major League, Sams signed a minor league contract with the Seattle Mariners on July 2, 2006. In 2007, he was assigned to Single-A Wisconsin, but was demoted to Short-Season A Everett. In 104 games that season, Sams hit .216 with 11 HR and 30 RBI.

Sams played 2008 with Advanced Rookie Pulaski. In 32 games, Sams hit .204 with 10 HR and 20 RBI. Sams opened 2009 with Single-A Clinton, and played 4 games with Everett before his season ended in late June. In 20 total games, Sams hit .208 with 4 HR and 12 RBI.

Sams played most of 2010 with Clinton, but was demoted to Everett in August. In 105 total games, .183 with 20 HR and 58 RBI. Sams began 2011 with A-Advanced High Desert, but was demoted to Clinton in May. In 113 total games, .231 with 24 HR and 66 RBI. Sams played 2012 with Double-A Jackson, where in 72 games, he hit .242 with 11 HR and 35 RBI.

On April 23, 2013, Sams was released by the Mariners.

San Diego Padres
On May 5, 2013, Sams signed a minor league deal with the San Diego Padres, and began the year with Double-A San Antonio. In June, Sams was promoted to Triple-A Tucson. On July 20, Sams was released by the Padres. In 50 games in the Padres organization, Sams hit .215 with 11 HR and 30 RBI.

Camden Riversharks
On August 3, 2013, Sams signed with the Camden Riversharks of the Atlantic League of Professional Baseball, where he played in 5 games, hitting 10-15 with 3 HR and 9 RBI. He became a free agent after the season.

Texas Rangers
He signed a minor league deal with the Texas Rangers on August 10, 2013. In 20 games with Double-A Frisco, he hit .286 with 4 HR and 10 RBI. On November 23, 2013, Sams re-signed with the Rangers on a new minor league contract. He was released by Texas on March 23, 2014.

Camden Riversharks (second stint)
On April 8, 2014, Sams re-signed with the Camden Riversharks in the Atlantic League of Professional Baseball. He only played in 16 games for Camden in 2014, notching 13 hits in 56 at-bats, including 2 home runs. He became a free agent after the season.

Québec Capitales
Sams joined the Québec Capitales of the Can-Am League for the 2015 season, and batted .279/.374/.534 with 16 home runs and 65 RBI. Sams also appeared in 5 games for the Corendon Kinheim in the Honkbal Hoofdklasse.

Delfines de Ciudad del Carmen
On February 24, 2016, Sams signed with the Delfines de Ciudad del Carmen of the Mexican League. Sams appeared in 7 games for the club, notching 7 hits in 16 at-bats before being released on May 4, 2016.

Québec Capitales
After his release from the LMB, Sams re-signed with the Québec Capitales for the 2016 season. In 61 games, Sams slashed .277/.372/.504 with 12 home runs and 41 RBI. In 2017 with Québec, Sams batted .291/.350/.593 with 23 home runs and a career-high 70 RBI. He also played in 5 games for L&D Amsterdam in the Honkbal Hoofdklasse. In 2018 for Québec, Sams batted .311/.391/.500 with 11 home runs and 48 RBI, and appeared in 3 games for Amsterdam. In total, Sams played in 289 games for the Capitales from 2015 to 2018.

High Point Rockers
On March 21, 2019, Sams signed with the High Point Rockers of the Atlantic League of Professional Baseball. He batted .203/.292/.297 before being released on July 7, 2019.

Sussex County Miners
On July 13, 2019, Sams signed with the Sussex County Miners of the Can-Am League. He hit .278/.353/.467 before he was released on August 15, 2019.

L&D Amsterdam
On August 19, 2019, Sams signed with the L&D Amsterdam of the Honkbal Hoofdklasse, and played in 1 game for the club, going hitless in 2 plate appearances. Sams played in 20 games for Amsterdam in 2020, slashing an amazing .359/.516/.813 with 8 home runs and 27 RBI. He remained with the club to begin the 2021 season.

Personal life
Sams was born in the Netherlands and is of Curaçao descent.

References

External links

1986 births
Living people
ADO players
Algodoneros de Guasave players
Camden Riversharks players
Clinton LumberKings players
Corendon Kinheim players
Delfines de Ciudad del Carmen players
Dutch expatriate baseball players in Canada
Dutch expatriate baseball players in Mexico
Dutch expatriate baseball players in the United States
Dutch people of Curaçao descent
Everett AquaSox players
Frisco RoughRiders players
High Desert Mavericks players
High Point Rockers players
Hypotheekzeker Tornados players
Jackson Generals (Southern League) players
Mexican League baseball center fielders
Pulaski Mariners players
Québec Capitales players
San Antonio Missions players
Sportspeople from The Hague
Sussex County Miners players
Tucson Padres players
Wisconsin Timber Rattlers players
2013 World Baseball Classic players
2016 European Baseball Championship players
2017 World Baseball Classic players
2019 European Baseball Championship players